In Dreams is a 1992 anthology book of science fiction and horror short stories, 'a celebration of the 7-inch single in all-original SF and horror fiction'. It includes stories by Jonathan Carroll, Greg Egan, Ian R. MacLeod, Alastair Reynolds, Lewis Shiner, and Don Webb. It was edited by Paul J. McAuley and Kim Newman, and published by Gollancz.

The Alastair Reynolds story from In Dreams, "Digital to Analogue", was re-published in a special edition of Zima Blue and Other Stories (2006).

1992 anthologies
Science fiction anthologies
Horror anthologies
Victor Gollancz Ltd books